Phyllostachys aurea is a species of bamboo, and is of the 'running bamboo' type, belonging to the diverse Bambuseae tribe. It is native to Fujian and Zhejiang in China. It is commonly known by the names fishpole bamboo, golden bamboo, monk's belly bamboo, and fairyland bamboo (Australia).

Cultivation
Phyllostachis aurea is cultivated as an ornamental plant for gardens. In the United States, Australia and Italy, it is considered an invasive species that crowds out native species and becomes a monoculture that is difficult to remove. It is a cold-hardy bamboo, performing well in USDA zones 6 to 10, (Connecticut to Florida). In the UK it has gained the Royal Horticultural Society's Award of Garden Merit. It is a tall evergreen species growing to  
tall by  broad. Like most bamboos it can become invasive if kept in warm, moist conditions in good quality soil with access to full sunlight. It is a prohibited species in New York.

Cultivars
Cultivars include:
 P. aurea 'Flavescens Inversa' – some lower culms may show a pale yellow stripe on the sulcus
 P. aurea 'Holochrysa' – common name "golden golden", culms turn yellow/gold sooner than the type form, random leaves have a yellow stripe
 P. aurea  'Koi' – culms turn yellow, but sulcus stays green, random leaves have a yellow stripe
 P. aurea  'Takemurai' – culms grow taller and lack the compressed internodes of the type form

Uses
P. aurea'''s lush foliage makes it desirable for ornamental purposes and privacy hedges, and its characteristic 'knotty' compressed lower internodes render it desirable among collectors. It is well-suited to the making of bamboo pipes.

Identification and growth habit

The common forms of P. aurea are easily identified by their characteristic compressed internodes in the lower part of the canes which have a tortoise shell-like appearance. This internodal compression result in shorter heights (25 ft) and thicker cane diameters (relative to height) than many other Phyllostachys species.

The canes turn yellow in full or partial sun, and deepen into a gold-orange color as the plant matures. Branching and foliage tend to start lower to the ground than many other Phyllostachys'' species, but some prefer to cut off lower branches to show off the interesting 'tortoise shell' lower part of the canes.

References

External links

Species Profile - Golden Bamboo (Phyllostachys aurea), National Invasive Species Information Center, United States National Agricultural Library. 

aurea
Flora of China
Plants described in 1878
Garden plants of Asia